Styopa is a Russian-language given name, a diminutive from Stepan. It can also be used as a full name. Notable people with the name include:

Styopa Mkrtchyan, Armenian footballer
Styopa Safaryan, Armenian politician

Fictional characters
Uncle Styopa
Stephan Bogdanovich Likhodeyev, a character from The Master and Margarita

See also